Season nine of the television program American Experience originally aired on the PBS network in the United States on October 6, 1996 and concluded on July 28, 1997. This is the ninth season to feature David McCullough as the host. The season contained 20 new episodes and began with the first part of the film TR, The Story of Theodore Roosevelt. The 11-part Vietnam: A Television History miniseries was a rebroadcast of the production originally shown in 1983. Episode two "The First Vietnam War" and episode 13 "Legacies" were dropped from the 1997 rebroadcast. Episode 12 "The End of the Tunnel (1973–1975)" was rebroadcast as "The Fall of Saigon" for the 1997 airing.

Episodes

 Denotes multiple chapters that aired on the same date and share the same episode number

References

1996 American television seasons
1997 American television seasons
American Experience